Bernard Arthur Toone  (July 14, 1956 – July 9, 2022) was an American basketball player who played 23 games for the Philadelphia 76ers in the National Basketball Association (NBA) during the 1979–80 season.  He earlier played college basketball for the Marquette Golden Eagles and helped the school win its only NCAA championship in 1977.

Early life
Toone was born in Yonkers, New York, on July 14, 1956.  He attended Gorton High School in his hometown, where he was an all-state player and a Parade All-American during his final year of high school in 1975.  He was also ranked as one of the top American high school basketball players that year, when Gorton upset Lincoln High School, who were Section 1 AA champions, in a challenge game.  Toone then studied at Marquette University, and worked at a Miller Brewing Company brewery in Milwaukee with Jim Boylan during the summer.

College career
Toone played collegiately for the Marquette Warriors (later to become the Golden Eagles) from 1975 to 1979.  As a sophomore reserve, he was a member of the Warriors' 1977 National Championship team in Hall of Fame coach Al McGuire's final season.  His uneasy relationship with McGuire was fueled in part by Toone's lack of playing time and McGuire's belief that Toone was indifferent towards improving as a player, specifically his defense.  The two quarrelled publicly throughout the season, including in the NCAA Tournament.  On one earlier occasion, during the first game of the Christmas Classic against the Clemson Tigers, McGuire took Toone off in the first half after the latter allowed a Tigers player to outmaneuver him and score.  McGuire then continuously berated Toone to the point of tears.  The home crowd – who were unhappy with McGuire despite being accustomed to his behavior – consequently gave Toone a standing ovation when he came back during the second half.

Toone went on to score 18 points as a substitute against Wake Forest in the Midwest Regional Final, and was named as the most outstanding player of that round.  He later played down his conflict with McGuire, stating that "it all paid off when we won the championship" and that "it meant a lot to me with all the controversy me and Al had".  As a senior, he averaged 18.7 points and 6.7 rebounds per game and was named a fourth-team All-American by the National Association of Basketball Coaches (NABC).

Professional career
After his college eligibility was over, Toone was selected in the second round (37th overall selection) of the 1979 NBA Draft by the Philadelphia 76ers.  He made his NBA debut on October 17, 1979, scoring two points to go along with two assists and one rebound in six minutes played against the New Jersey Nets.  His NBA career lasted only one season, as he averaged 2.4 points and 1.5 rebounds per game in a reserve role for the 76ers in 1979–80.  He later played professional basketball overseas, with clubs in Italy, Venezuela, the Netherlands, and West Germany.

Later life
After retiring from professional basketball, Toone resided in New York, where he played in summer basketball tournaments with Ken Owens and Gary Springer.  He reportedly worked at a doctor's office in his hometown during the 1990s.

Toone was arrested on three occasions during the 1980s, twice for trying to steal vehicle audio and once for driving a rental car that had been reported stolen.  He also had issues with drug use.  In 2014, he was featured in an ESPN documentary film called Untucked, broadcast on the show 30 for 30.  He went back to Marquette in 2007 to attend the 30-year reunion of its championship team but was absent from the 40th anniversary celebrations in December 2016 due to a minor illness.

Toone died on July 9, 2022. He was 65 and suffered from cancer prior to his death.

Notes

References

External links

1956 births
2022 deaths
American expatriate basketball people in Italy
American expatriate basketball people in Venezuela
American men's basketball players
Basketball players from New York (state) 
Deaths from cancer in New York (state)
Gaiteros del Zulia players
Juvecaserta Basket players
Marquette Golden Eagles men's basketball players
Parade High School All-Americans (boys' basketball)
Philadelphia 76ers draft picks
Philadelphia 76ers players
Power forwards (basketball)
Sportspeople from Yonkers, New York